Julie Crysler is a Canadian journalist and a published poet. In 1996 she was voted Montreal's second-best poet. She was the editor of This Magazine from 2000 to 2004, and is currently a producer for CBC Radio One.

References 

20th-century Canadian poets
Canadian magazine journalists
Canadian women poets
Living people
Year of birth missing (living people)
Canadian women journalists
Canadian radio producers
20th-century Canadian women writers
Canadian women non-fiction writers
Women radio producers